Night Time Stories is an English independent record label founded by Paul Glancy in 2009. It is notable for releasing the Late Night Tales compilation series since 2009 by artists such as Trentemøller, Röyksopp, Bonobo, Jon Hopkins, Bill Brewster, Groove Armada, and Floating Points among many others, while label founder Glancy has been helming the project since 2003. In 2013, Night Time Stories started to release original material by artists such as Khruangbin, Session Victim, Leifur James, Sasha, Ash Walker, Garden City Movement, and Rae & Christian.

Releases

See also
 Late Night Tales

References

External links
  of Night Time Stories
  of Late Night Tales

Night Time Stories
British independent record labels
Record labels established in 2009